Rogalands Fremtid was a Norwegian newspaper, published in Sauda in Rogaland county.

History and profile
Rogalands Fremtid was started in 1930 as the only Communist Party organ in the whole county. However, the party struggled economically and the newspaper went defunct after its last issue on 18 July 1931.

References

1930 establishments in Norway
1931 disestablishments in Norway
Communist Party of Norway newspapers
Defunct newspapers published in Norway
Norwegian-language newspapers
Newspapers established in 1930
Publications disestablished in 1931
Mass media in Rogaland